The NatWest Pro40 League was a one-day cricket league for first-class cricket counties in England and Wales. It was inaugurated in 1999, but was essentially the old Sunday League retitled to reflect large numbers of matches being played on days other than Sunday.

Sunday League
The Sunday League was launched in 1969, as the second one-day competition in England and Wales alongside the Gillette Cup (launched in 1963). Sponsored by John Player & Sons, the league was called John Player's County League (1969), the John Player League (1970–83), then the John Player Special League (1984–86). The 17 counties of the time played each other in a league format on Sunday afternoons throughout the season. These matches were concise enough to be shown on television, with BBC2 broadcasting one match each week in full until 1980, and then as part of the Sunday Grandstand multi-sport programme. For close finishes for the title, cameras appeared at the grounds where the contenders for the title were competing and the trophy presentation to the victorious team would be on film.

Refuge Assurance replaced John Player Special as the sponsor of the competition, called the Refuge Assurance League, in 1987. In 1988 they introduced an end-of-season play-off competition known as the Refuge Assurance Cup. The top four teams of the league season qualified for this competition, with the first-placed team playing the fourth and the second-placed team playing the third, and the winners of these matches meeting in a final at a neutral venue. This competition lasted until 1991.

On Friday 5 July 1991, Somerset played Lancashire at Taunton in the first Sunday League match not to be played on a Sunday.

The Sunday League was not sponsored in 1992 (Durham making its debut in the competition this season), but in 1993 AXA Equity and Law became the sponsor. The matches this season were 50 overs per innings. The first round of matches that took place on 9 May 1993 were the first official matches in England to be played in coloured clothing and with a white ball. The following season the competition reverted to 40 overs per innings. On Wednesday 23 July 1997 Warwickshire played Somerset at Edgbaston in the first competitive county game to be played under floodlights.

National League
The National League was launched in 1999 with the 18 first-class counties split into two divisions with three teams promoted and relegated from each. The matches were played over 45 overs and the competition was sponsored by Norwich Union. Matches were spread over the week rather than Sundays only.

The counties incorporated nicknames into their official names for the National League, from 2002. For example, Kent became the 'Spitfires', Middlesex the 'Crusaders' and Lancashire were the 'Lightning'. The following season the Scotland Saltires took part in the League until 2005.

The C & G Trophy was restructured, in 2006, from a knock-out competition to a round-robin league format, which took up the early part of the season. The National League was renamed the 'NatWest Pro40' and was played in the later part of the season with the teams playing each other once. Also, two teams instead of three were promoted to the first division and two relegated to the second division. A third promotion/relegation spot was determined in a play-off game between the team third from top in the second division and third from bottom team in the first.

Replacement
In July 2009, the ECB unveiled plans for a revamped county structure involving three competitions, one of which would replace both the Pro40 and the Friends Provident Trophy.

On 27 August 2009, this new competition was announced as a 40-overs-per-innings tournament, similar to the Pro40. The ECB 40, also known as the Clydesdale Bank 40 for sponsorship reasons, would serve as one of the three competitions in county cricket for the next four years, along with the County Championship and the Friends Provident t20.

Teams
Division 1 teams in 2009:
 Durham Dynamos
 Essex Eagles
 Gloucestershire Gladiators
 Hampshire Hawks
 Nottinghamshire Outlaws
 Somerset Sabres
 Sussex Sharks
 Worcestershire Royals
 Yorkshire Carnegie

Division 2 teams in 2009:
 Derbyshire Phantoms
 Glamorgan Dragons
 Kent Spitfires
 Lancashire Lightning
 Leicestershire Foxes
 Middlesex Panthers
 Northamptonshire Steelbacks
 Surrey Brown Caps
 Warwickshire Bears

Results

National League

Sunday League
AXA League

AXA Life League

AXA Equity & Law League

Sunday League

John Player Special League

John Player League

John Player's County League

Tournaments won by county

See also

 National League Division One in 2005
 National League Division Two in 2005
 County Championship – the domestic first class competition in England and Wales
 Friends Provident Trophy (formerly C&G Trophy) – the one-day knock out competition
 Twenty20 Cup – the short-form competition

Notes

External links

 ECB Natwest Pro40 website
 Warwickshire v Somerset July 1997 – Electronic Telegraph

 
English domestic cricket competitions
Recurring sporting events established in 1969
Recurring sporting events disestablished in 2009
List A cricket competitions
NatWest Group